Afghanistan participated in the 2014 Asian Games in Incheon, South Korea from 19 September to 4 October 2014.

Medal summary

Medalists

Athletics

Men

Track events

Women

Track events

Badminton

Men

Singles

Doubles

Boxing

Men

Cricket

Men

Squad

Knockout round

Quarterfinal

Semifinal

Final

Final standing

Football

Group B

Volleyball

Beach

References

Nations at the 2014 Asian Games
2014
Asian Games